Hexamastix coercens is a species of parabasalid.

References

Further reading
Martinez-Girón, Rafael, and Hugo Cornelis van Woerden. "Lophomonas blattarum and bronchopulmonary disease." Journal of Medical Microbiology62.Pt 11 (2013): 1641-1648.

External links

Metamonads